Petroravenia eseptata is a plant species native to Argentina. It is also type species for its genus, Petroravenia, first described in 1994.

Petroravenia eseptata is a perennial herb spreading by means of underground rhizomes. All the above-ground vegetative parts are covered with finely branched hairs. Leaves are sessile (without ), ovate to elliptical, up to 4 mm (0.16 inches) long. Petals 4, white, narrow. Fruits are egg-shaped, up to 5 mm (0.1 inches) long, lacking septum, with 8-18 seeds per fruit.

References

Brassicaceae
Flora of Argentina